Tonko is a South Slavic masculine given name.

In Croatian, it is a hypocorism of the name Antun and other cognates of Antonius.

It is found in Slovene as a diminutive form of Anton, Antonij, and Antonijo in Slovenia.

Given name
Tonko Lonza (1930 – 2018), Croatian actor
Tonko Soljan, Croatian American film and television producer

Surname
Paul Tonko (born 1949), American politician

See also

Tanko (name)
Tenko (disambiguation)
Tokko (disambiguation)
Toko (disambiguation)
Tondo (disambiguation)
Tongo (disambiguation)
Tonho (name)
Tonio (name)
Tonk (disambiguation)
Tonka (name)
Tono (name)
Tonto (disambiguation)

Notes

Croatian masculine given names
Slovene masculine given names